Thomas Haden Church (born Thomas Richard McMillen; June 17, 1960) is an American actor. After starring in the 1990s sitcom Wings and playing the lead for two seasons in Ned & Stacey (1995–1997), Church became known for his film work, including his role of Lyle van de Groot in George of the Jungle (1997), his Academy Award-nominated performance in Sideways (2004), his role as the Marvel Comics villain Sandman in the superhero films Spider-Man 3 (2007) and Spider-Man: No Way Home (2021), as well as his starring roles in Smart People (2008), Easy A (2010), We Bought a Zoo (2011), and Hellboy (2019). He also made his directorial debut with Rolling Kansas (2003).

Early life
Church was born Thomas Richard McMillen in Woodland, Yolo County, California, the son of Maxine (née Sanders) and Carlos Richard "Carl" McMillen, who served for eight years in the Marines and who was on active duty at the end of the Korean War; after 1962, Carlos worked as a surveyor. Church's parents divorced and his mother moved to Laredo, Texas. She remarried in 1969, to widower George A. Quesada, a veteran of an Army Air Forces reconnaissance unit which served in Guam in World War II. Church took his stepfather's surname for a time but changed it to 'Haden Church', extracted from the names of other relatives, when people found 'Quesada' difficult to pronounce. He left high school in 1977 to work in the oil fields of Louisiana, but he returned to graduate from Harlingen High School in 1979. He attended the University of North Texas while living in Dallas.

Career
Church started in the entertainment business as a radio personality and doing voice-over work. After appearing in an independent film, he moved to California to pursue an acting career. His character delivers a love letter to Carla Tortelli (Rhea Perlman) from her deceased former lover, Eddie LaBec, in the Cheers episode, "Death Takes a Vacation on Ice". He played the part of slow-witted aircraft mechanic Lowell Mather for six seasons (1990–95) on the NBC sitcom Wings.

He worked in television for two more seasons, with a lead role in Ned & Stacey opposite Debra Messing. He has had supporting roles in films such as Tombstone, George of the Jungle, The Specials, and Demon Knight.

Church bought a ranch in Texas in 1998. In late 2000, he took a break from films. After having small roles in films such as Monkeybone and 3000 Miles to Graceland, he made his directorial debut with Rolling Kansas in 2003. He has voiceover work in commercials, such as for Merrill Lynch and Icehouse beer. 

In 2003, director Alexander Payne called him regarding the role of Jack, the selfish best friend of Paul Giamatti's character, in Sideways. During the audition, Church stripped naked to read the audition scene, later saying "To me, it was painfully obvious... I was reading the scene where Jack comes in naked and there has to be in-born vulnerability in the scene." (He later found that he was the only actor to strip down for the audition). Sideways earned acclaim for Church; he  won an IFP Independent Spirit Award and was nominated for the Academy Award for Best Supporting Actor.

He has since appeared in films such as Idiocracy, done voice-over work on films such as Over the Hedge and starred in one of AMC's highest rated television productions, Broken Trail, with Robert Duvall, in 2006, for which he won an Emmy. In 2007, he appeared as the villain Sandman in Sam Raimi's Spider-Man 3 starring Tobey Maguire and Kirsten Dunst. He received praise for his portrayal of the character. Although he was not present on set he lent his voice to Sandman (digitally created) for the Marvel Cinematic Universe (MCU) film Spider-Man: No Way Home, released in 2021 and linked both the Raimi and Marc Webb franchises to the MCU. Archival footage from Spider-Man 3 was used to show his human form at the end of the film where Jon Watts provided the motion-capture for Sandman.

In 2005, he was invited to join the Academy of Motion Picture Arts and Sciences. In October 2008, Church appeared as "Joe Six-Pack" in a video on funnyordie.com, challenging Joe the Plumber to a beer-drinking contest. Church starred in the FEARnet webseries, Zombie Roadkill, alongside David Dorfman. He also appeared in the HBO original series Divorce.

In December 2021, it was announced that Church will star alongside Toni Collette and Anna Faris in the comedy film The Estate, directed by Dean Craig.

Personal life
Church lives on his  ranch in Kerrville, Texas. During the filming of Divorce, he rented a house in New Rochelle, New York. He has two children from a former relationship with Mia Zottoli. Church has never married.  Church's father, Carl, died in 2008, and his stepfather, George, died in 2012.

Filmography

Film

Television

Video games

Awards and nominations 
Church has received multiple awards and nominations for his roles in both television and film. He earned an Academy Award nomination for Best Supporting Actor in 2005 for his role as Jack in Sideways (2004), two Golden Globe Award nominations for Best Supporting Actor in 2004 for the film Sideways (2004) and Best Supporting Actor in 2007 for the miniseries Broken Trail (2006), won a Primetime Emmy Award for Outstanding Supporting Actor in a Limited or Anthology Series or Movie in 2007 for Broken Trail (2006), and won one of three Screen Actors Guild Award nominations in 2005 for Screen Actors Guild Award for Outstanding Performance by a Cast in a Motion Picture for Sideways (2004).

References

External links
 
 

1960 births
20th-century American male actors
21st-century American male actors
American male film actors
American male television actors
American male voice actors
American male video game actors
Independent Spirit Award for Best Supporting Male winners
Living people
Male actors from Texas
Outstanding Performance by a Cast in a Motion Picture Screen Actors Guild Award winners
Outstanding Performance by a Supporting Actor in a Miniseries or Movie Primetime Emmy Award winners
People from Harlingen, Texas
People from Laredo, Texas
University of North Texas alumni